Sunni Islam was the official religion of the Ottoman Empire. The highest position in Islam, caliphate, was claimed by the sultan, after the defeat of the Mamluks which was established as Ottoman Caliphate. The sultan was to be a devout Muslim and was given the literal authority of the caliph. Additionally, Sunni clerics had tremendous influence over government and their authority was central to the regulation of the economy. Despite all this, the sultan also had a right to the decree, enforcing a code called Kanun (law) in Turkish. Additionally, there was a supreme clerical position called the Sheykhulislam ("Sheykh of Islam" in Arabic). Minorities, particularly Christians and Jews but also some others, were mandated to pay the jizya, the poll tax as mandated by traditional Islam.

Sunni Islam

Creed and madhab
Since the founding of the Ottoman Empire, the Ottomans followed the Hanafi madhab (school of Islamic jurisprudence). However, it was the Ash'ari creed that was more prevalent in the madrassahs (Islamic schools). Both the Maturidi and Ash'ari schools of Islamic theology used Ilm al-Kalam to understand the Quran and the hadith (sayings and actions of Mohammed and the Rashidun) so as to apply Islamic principles to fatwas (Islamic rulings).

Superstitions
Ottomans often wore little charms, such as necklaces, to protect themselves from evil. The greatest of these evils, to which most of this charm was the Evil Eye. The Evil Eye was no specific evil, but was most often attributed as jealousy.

Alevism

Because of their heterodox beliefs and practices, Alevis have been the target of historical and recent oppression. They sided with the Persian Empire against the Ottoman Empire and forty thousand Alevis were killed in 1514 by Ottomans. The Qizilbash of Anatolia found themselves on the "wrong" side of the Ottoman-Safavid border after 1555 Peace of Amasya. They become subjects of an Ottoman court that viewed them with suspicion. In that troubled period under Suleiman the Magnificent the Alevi people were persecuted and murdered.

Footnotes

References

 
Ottoman Empire